Awake is the second studio album from Australian electronic DJ and Producer Alison Wonderland. It was released on 6 April 2018 via EMI Music Australia. The album features four singles: "Happy Place", "Church", "No" and "High". In August 2018, Wonderland announced a 4-date national tour commencing in Brisbane in November 2018.

At the ARIA Music Awards of 2018, the album was nominated for two awards; Best Female Artist and Best Dance Release.

Critical reception
Matt Collar from AllMusic said: "Showcasing the Aussie DJ's brightly effusive vocals and shimmering, propulsive electronic productions, Awake is an expansive, deeply felt album."

Singles
"Happy Place" was released on 9 November 2017 as the album's lead single alongside the album's announcement. She told Triple J: "I wrote it about me trying to find my 'Happy Place'." "Church" was released as the album's second single on 16 February 2018. The song has peaked at number 54 on the ARIA Singles Chart. "No" was released on 9 March 2018 and is about "fake people". "High" was released on 20 March 2018 as the album's fourth single.

Track listing

Charts

Release history

References

2018 albums
Alison Wonderland albums